Dejan Radić (born ) is a Serbian male volleyball player. He is part of the Serbia men's national volleyball team. He competed at the 2015 European Games in Baku. On club level he plays for AS Cannes.

See also
 Serbia at the 2015 European Games

References

1984 births
Living people
Volleyball players at the 2015 European Games
European Games competitors for Serbia
Place of birth missing (living people)
Serbian expatriate sportspeople in Montenegro
Serbian expatriate sportspeople in Belgium
Serbian expatriate sportspeople in France
Serbian men's volleyball players
Mediterranean Games bronze medalists for Serbia
Mediterranean Games medalists in volleyball
Competitors at the 2005 Mediterranean Games
Expatriate volleyball players in Montenegro
Expatriate volleyball players in Belgium
Expatriate volleyball players in France